Bastian Trost (born 29 March 1974) is a German actor. He has appeared in 30 films and television shows since 1994. He starred in the film Schläfer, which was screened in the Un Certain Regard section at the 2005 Cannes Film Festival.

Selected filmography
 After the Truth (1999)
 Schläfer (2005)
 The Lives of Others (2006)
 Eine flexible Frau (2010)

References

External links

1974 births
Living people
German male film actors
Actors from Düsseldorf